Major General David Tennant Cowan,  (9 October 1896 – 15 April 1983), also known as "Punch" Cowan, was an officer in the British Army and British Indian Army during the First and Second World Wars. He led the 17th Indian Infantry Division during almost the entire Burma campaign.

Early career and inter-war years
Cowan was educated at Reading School and Glasgow University. He was commissioned into the Argyll and Sutherland Highlanders in 1915. Awarded the Military Cross and mentioned in despatches, he was attached to the Indian Army in 1917, his appointment being confirmed in March 1918 whilst serving with the 4th battalion 3rd Gurkha Rifles. He later joined the 6th Gurkha Rifles.

Between the wars, he served on the North-West frontier (where he was again mentioned in despatches for service in Waziristan) and in various staff positions. From 1932 to 1934, he was the Chief Instructor at the Indian Military Academy and in 1937 he was once more mentioned in despatches during a further tour of duty in Waziristan. By the outbreak of World War II, he was in command of the 1st Battalion, 6th Gurkha Rifles.

Field hockey
Cowan also played field hockey in regimental army teams in United Kingdom and India. He was appointed the captain of the Indian Army national field hockey team for their first international tour of New Zealand and Australia in 1926. He also served as the team manager for the tour.

Second World War
He was appointed a General Staff Officer, 1st grade in India from 18 September 1940 to 17 February 1941.

Appointed acting brigadier, he was Director of Military Training in India from 18 February 1941 to 30 September 1941, then deputy director of Military Training in India 1 October 1941 to 14 December 1941, then Director of Military Training in India from 15 December 1941 to 1 March 1942. 
When the Japanese invaded Burma, he was posted to Rangoon, initially as a staff officer in Burma Army HQ with rather ill-defined duties, but was appointed acting Major-General and commander of the Indian 17th Infantry Division when its previous commander, Jackie Smyth VC, was relieved after a bridge was blown behind the retreating division and much of it was cut off.

He remained in command of the division for the rest of the Burma Campaign: during the retreat into India, the fighting around Tiddim in 1943, the Battle of Imphal in 1944 and the drive into Central Burma in 1945. Early in 1945, his son was killed whilst serving as an officer in Cowan's old unit (1/6 Gurkha Rifles). He fought the decisive Battle of Meiktila having suffered this loss, although only a few close friends were aware of it. For his leadership in Burma he was twice awarded the Distinguished Service Order. His army commander, Bill Slim, was later to write about Cowan's handling of the Meiktila battle:

He was promoted to the rank of substantive Major-General on 12 February 1945. A fine picture of the soldier's life, fighting in his Division, is found in George MacDonald Fraser's memoir Quartered Safe Out Here (London, Harvill 1993).

He was intended to lead the Indian army contingent of the Commonwealth Corps being tentatively formed to participate in the planned invasion of Japan. The surrender of Japan changed these plans, and Cowan instead led the joint British-Indian division BRINDIV, part of the British Commonwealth Occupation Force, in Japan. In 1947, he handed over command of this force and retired from the army.

Career summary
 Commissioned 3rd (Special Reserve) Battalion Argyll & Sutherland Highlanders (1915)
 Transferred to 6th Gurkha Rifles, British Indian Army (1917)
 Attended Command and Staff College, Quetta (1927–1928)
 Assistant Military Secretary, India (1930–1932)
 Chief Instructor at Indian Military Academy (1932–1934)
 General Staff Officer 2, India, Waziristan (1936–1938)
 Commanding Officer 1st Battalion 6th Gurkha Rifles (1939–1940)
 General Staff Officer 1, India (1940–1941)
 Deputy Director of Military Training, India (1941–1942)
 General Officer Commanding Indian 17th Infantry Division, Burma (1942)
 General Officer Commanding 17th Indian Light Division, Burma (1942–1944)
 General Officer Commanding 17th Indian Division, Burma (1944–1945)
 General Officer Commanding Force152 (1945)
 General Officer Commanding BRINJAP Division, Japan (1945–1947)
 Retired (1947)

References

Bibliography

External links
Indian Army Officers 1939–1945
Generals of World War II

1896 births
1983 deaths
Argyll and Sutherland Highlanders officers
British Army personnel of World War I
Indian Army personnel of World War I
Indian Army generals of World War II
Recipients of the Military Cross
Companions of the Order of the Bath
Commanders of the Order of the British Empire
Companions of the Distinguished Service Order
British military personnel of the Waziristan Campaign
People educated at Reading School
Graduates of the Staff College, Quetta
Deputy Lieutenants of Devon
Alumni of the University of Glasgow
British Indian Army generals
British people in colonial India
Indian male field hockey players
British male field hockey players
British expatriates in Spain